Athill is an English language toponymic surname from Middle English atte hill meaning "(dweller) at the hill".

Notable people with this name include:

 Charles Athill (1853–1922), officer of arms at the College of Arms in London
 Diana Athill (1917–2019), British literary editor, novelist, and memoirist

See also

References 

English toponymic surnames